Ultrasound 1997–2003 is Taiwanese Mandopop singer-songwriter David Tao's first compilation album. It was released on 8 August 2003 by EMI Music Taiwan. It features four new tracks as well as 11 previously released tracks, from his debut album, David Tao in 1997 to his third album Black Tangerine in 2003.

The track "今天没回家" (Shanghaied) is listed at number 6 on Hit Fm Taiwan's Hit Fm Annual Top 100 Singles Chart (Hit-Fm年度百首單曲) for 2003.

Track listing
New tracks in bold
 "今天没回家" (Shanghaied)  – 3:54
 "王八蛋" (Bastard) – 4:13
 "普通朋友" (Regular Friends) – 4:13
 "小鎮姑娘" (Small Town Girl) – 4:55
 "沙灘" (Blue Moon) – 3:59
 "飛機場的10:30" (Airport) – 3:05
 "My Anata" – 3:46
 "我喜歡" (I Like It)  – 3:36
 "天天" (Close To You) – 4:14
 "Melody" – 4:32
 "找自己" (Rain) – 5:03
 "寂寞的季節" (Season Of Loneliness)  – 3:34
 "黑色柳丁" (Black Tangerine)  – 4;16
 "愛很簡單" (I Love You) – 4:27
 "Runaway" – 4:15

References

External links
  David Tao@Gold Typhoon formerly EMI Music Taiwan

2003 compilation albums
David Tao albums
Gold Typhoon Taiwan albums